The 2003 Australian motorcycle Grand Prix was the penultimate round of the 2003 MotoGP Championship. It took place on the weekend of 17–19 October 2003 at the Phillip Island Grand Prix Circuit. The MotoGP race was famous after Valentino Rossi won the world title after getting a 10-second penalty after overtaking under yellow flags after Troy Bayliss had crashed.

MotoGP classification

250 cc classification

125 cc classification

Championship standings after the race (motoGP)

Below are the standings for the top five riders and constructors after round fifteen has concluded.

Riders' Championship standings

Constructors' Championship standings

 Note: Only the top five positions are included for both sets of standings.

Notes

References

Australian motorcycle Grand Prix
Australian
Motorcycle Grand Prix
Motorsport at Phillip Island